Nache Nagin Gali Gali   is a 1989 Bollywood film directed by Mohanji Prasad starring Meenakshi Seshadri, Nitish Bharadwaj, Asha Lata, Satyendra Kapoor, Sadashiv Amrapurkar, Suhas Joshi.

Cast
Meenakshi Seshadri as Mohini
Nitish Bhardwaj as Nagesh/Kamal(double role) 
Sahila Chadha as Roop
Sadashiv Amrapurkar as Tantrik
Satyen Kappu as Gurudev
Yunus Parvez as Shera Pahalwan
Vikas Anand as Roop's Father
Shriram Lagoo as Kamal's Father
Shantipriya as cameo appearance in a song
Kunika as cameo appearance in a song
Paintal
Dinesh Hingoo as Doctor

Music

The music for Naache Nagin Gali Gali  is composed by Kalyanji–Anandji  while the lyrics are penned by Anjaan

Attack on Meenakshi Sheshadri 
Meenakshi was sexually assaulted during the shoot by an extra. The shooting was going on at a bungalow in Juhu, Mumbai and a song were being filmed on Meenakshi. After the song was completed, Meenakshi approached her room inside the bungalow. Suddenly, a man ran towards her out of nowhere, grabbed her, and started forcing himself on her. Meenakshi was screaming and trying to push the attacker away, but the film unit and watchers believed that it was a scene in the film. It was only when Meenakshi started slapping the attacker for real that the unit came to her rescue and started beating the attacker. The Police was called and the attacker was handed over. However, Meenakshi's mother decided not to take any action against the attacker.

References

1980s Hindi-language films
1989 films
Films scored by Kalyanji Anandji
Films about snakes
Films about shapeshifting